Răzvan Iulian Ochiroșii (born 13 March 1989) is a Romanian footballer as a left back for SD Tarazona. He can also play as a left winger, and is known for his pace and skills.

Club career

Ochiroșii was born in Galați. After successfully graduating from Steaua Dunării Galați's Youth Academy, he signed a professional contract with Steaua București and made his debut in Liga I in May 2005 against FCM Bacău. He scored his first goal as a senior player on 2 August 2006, netting the last from a penalty kick in a 3–0 UEFA Champions League home win against ND Gorica, becoming Steaua's youngest scorer in a European competition at only 17 years, 4 months and 20 days.

Ochiroșii was loaned to Gloria Buzău in 2007, but was sparingly used after his return. On 5 January 2010, it was announced that 50% of his federative rights were given to Oțelul Galați, with Bulgarian defender Zhivko Zhelev moving in the opposite direction.

Ochiroșii was subsequently loaned to Săgeata Năvodari, Prahova Tomșani and Spanish sides CF Fuenlabrada and CD Guijuelo, the last two in Segunda División B. With the latter he appeared in 30 matches during the 2013–14 campaign, and signed a permanent two-year deal on 11 June 2014.

On 13 June 2015 Ochiroșii signed for AD Alcorcón in Segunda División, along with Guijuelo teammate Marc Nierga. On 20 July 2017 he moved to Marbella FC in the third division, after cutting ties with the Alfareros.

Ochiroșii resumed his career in the lower leagues, representing Unionistas de Salamanca CF and Guijuelo.

Honours

Club
Steaua București
Divizia A: 2005–06
Supercupa României: 2006

Oțelul Galați
Liga I: 2010–11

Unionistas de Salamanca
Tercera División: 2017–18

Trivia
His surname translates in English as Red Eyes.

References

External links
 
 
 
 
 Răzvan Ochiroșii at Unionistas de Salamanca Base de Datos

1989 births
Living people
Sportspeople from Galați
Romanian footballers
Association football defenders
Association football wingers
Association football utility players
Liga I players
Liga II players
Liga III players
FC Gloria Buzău players
ASC Oțelul Galați players
FC Steaua București players
FC Steaua II București players
AFC Săgeata Năvodari players
Segunda División B players
CF Fuenlabrada footballers
CD Guijuelo footballers
AD Alcorcón footballers
Marbella FC players
Unionistas de Salamanca CF players
SD Tarazona footballers
Segunda División players
Tercera División players
Segunda Federación players
Romanian expatriate footballers
Romanian expatriate sportspeople in Spain
Expatriate footballers in Spain